Flynn Whitcomb (December 20, 1833 – June 14, 1911) was an American farmer and politician from New York.

Life 
Whitcomb was born on December 20, 1833 in Granville, New York. His parents were Samuel Whitcomb, a preacher for the Methodist Episcopal Church, and Selinda Smith. Whitcomb moved to Walworth as an infant. In 1838, he moved to Ontario, New York.

After attending school, Whitcomb learned the carpenter trade. He spent most of his life working as a farmer, with his own 87 acre farm. He also was involved in fruit raising. He married Mary A. Clark of Williamson in 1854.

Whitcomb was Collector and Excise Commissioner for Ontario. In 1891, he was elected to the New York State Assembly as a Republican, representing the Wayne County 2nd District. He served in the Assembly in 1892.

Whitcomb died at home on June 14, 1911.

References

External links 

 The Political Graveyard

1833 births
1911 deaths
Republican Party members of the New York State Assembly
People from Granville, New York
People from Ontario, New York
19th-century American politicians
Farmers from New York (state)